Norfolk and Western Class J is a Class of 4-4-0 steam locomotives of the Norfolk and Western Railroad, United States. It was built from 1879 at the Baldwin Locomotive Works, Pennsylvania, and was retired in 1900 and scrapped. 

This was the first "J" class, and was followed by the J class of 1903 and the J class of 1941.

References

J1
Steam locomotives of the United States
Railway locomotives introduced in 1879
Standard gauge locomotives of the United States
Baldwin locomotives
Scrapped locomotives